On 5 August 1993, a train on the East West line of the Singapore Mass Rapid Transit (MRT) rear-ended another train that was stationary. It was the MRT's first major incident and resulted in 156 passengers being injured. It was caused by a maintenance vehicle leaking 50 litres (11 imp gal; 13 US gal) of oil onto the tracks.

Background
The MRT commenced operations in 1987, with the stretch of line from Outram Park MRT station to Clementi MRT station opening on 12 March 1988. At the time of the accident, the system had been operating for six years.

Incident
Before the start of service, a maintenance vehicle leaked oil onto the tracks from Buona Vista MRT station to Clementi MRT station until the junction with Ulu Pandan Depot. The first 10 westbound trains reported braking difficulties. The eleventh train had to use its emergency brakes to stop at the station. As a result, the train had to stop for a longer time at the station to recharge its batteries. At 7.50 am on 5 August 1993, the 12th train, collided with the stationary C151 at Clementi while it was recharging its batteries, resulting in 156 injuries.

Investigation
Preliminary investigation showed that the cause of the accident was a  oil spill caused by a defective rubber ring on a maintenance locomotive.

Aftermath
In the aftermath of the accident, SMRT said that it would replace the faulty maintenance locomotives and purchase new ones. It also introduced a new policy for station managers to inspect tracks for oil or foreign objects before the start of service. Train services resumed the day after the accident.

See also
Joo Koon rail accident

References

1993 in Singapore
Railway accidents in 1993
Accidents and incidents involving Mass Rapid Transit (Singapore)
Rail accidents and incidents in Singapore
1993 disasters in Singapore